The Connecticut Golf Hall of Fame honours people with connections to the state of Connecticut for their achievements and contributions in the sport of golf. Founded by the Greater Hartford Jaycees in 1955, the Connecticut State Golf Association took over as custodians of the hall in 1991.

Inductees
The following are inductees of the Connecticut Golf Hall of Fame.

References

Golf museums and halls of fame
1955 establishments in Connecticut
Halls of fame in Connecticut
State sports halls of fame in the United States